Elkstone is a village and civil parish in the English county of Gloucestershire. In the 2001 United Kingdom census, the parish had a population of 203, increasing to 248 at the 2011 census

History
Elkstone was listed as Elchestane in the Domesday Book of 1086. The Church of St John the Evangelist was built in Elkstone around 1160.It is a grade I listed building and contains an impressive norman tympanum and saxon stones.

Governance
The civil parish of Elkstone forms part of the Ermin ward, which is in the district of Cotswold, represented by Councillor Julia Judd, a member of the Conservative Party.

Elkstone is part of the parliamentary constituency of The Cotswolds, represented at parliament by Conservative Member of Parliament (MP) Geoffrey Clifton-Brown. Prior to Brexit in 2020, it was part of the South West England constituency of the European Parliament.

See also
List of civil parishes in Gloucestershire

References
Footnotes

Bibliography

External links

Civil parishes in Gloucestershire
Cotswold District
Villages in Gloucestershire